Minister of Police v Ewels, is an important case in both the South African law of delict and, to a lesser extent, South African criminal law. It expresses a general rule: An omission is to be regarded as unlawful conduct when the circumstances of the case are of such a nature not only that the omission incites moral indignation, but also that the legal convictions of the community demand that it be regarded as unlawful and that the damage suffered be made good by the person who neglected to perform a positive act. In order to make a determination as to whether or not there is unlawfulness, therefore, the question is not whether there was the usual "negligence" of the bonus paterfamilias; the question is whether, regard being had to all the facts, there was a duty in law to act reasonably.  
Saflii Court case 

In casu, a citizen was assaulted in a police station by an off-duty officer in the presence of other officers. It was held by the court, on the facts of this case, that a policeman on duty, if he witnesses an assault, has a duty to come to the assistance of the person being assaulted. The failure of the police to do so made the Minister of Police liable for damages.

See also 
 South African criminal law
 South African law of delict

References 
 Minister van Polisie v Ewels 1975 (3) SA 590 (A).

Notes 

1975 in South African law
1975 in case law
South African criminal case law
Appellate Division (South Africa) cases